Chambéry-Challes-les-Eaux station (French: Gare de Chambéry-Challes-les-Eaux) is a railway station in the Savoie département of France. The station serves the city of Chambéry. The station is served by three major high speed services, the TGV, Thalys and Frecciarossa.

Train services
The station is served by the following services:

High speed services (TGV) Paris - Lyon - Chambéry - Turin - Milan
High speed services (TGV) Paris - Chambéry - Aix-les-Bains - Annecy
High speed services (TGV) Annecy - Chambéry - Grenoble - Valence - Avignon - Marseille
High speed services (TGV) Paris - Chambéry - Albertville - Bourg-Saint-Maurice (Winter)
High speed services (Frecciarossa) Paris - Lyon - Chambéry - Turin - Milan
High speed service (Thalys) Amsterdam - Rotterdam - Antwerp - Brussels - Chambéry - Bourg-Saint-Maurice (Winter)
Regional services (TER Auvergne-Rhône-Alpes) Valence - Grenoble - Chambéry - Aix-les-Bains - Annecy
Regional services (TER Auvergne-Rhône-Alpes) Valence - Grenoble - Chambéry - Aix-les-Bains - Bellegarde - Geneva
Local services (TER Auvergne-Rhône-Alpes) Grenoble - Université - Montmélian - Chambéry

References

External links

 

Railway stations in Savoie
Transport in Chambéry
Buildings and structures in Chambéry
Railway stations in France opened in 1856